John Sartorius (1700? – 1780?) was an Anglo-German animal painter, the first of four generations of the celebrated Sartorius family of artists. He should not be confused with his great-grandson John Francis Sartorius.

Life and work
Sartorious was born in Nuremberg in Germany, first of four generations of artists who had a considerable vogue as painters of racehorses, hunters, and other sporting subjects. John's father was Jacob Christopher Sartorius (fl. 1694-1737), an engraver of Nuremberg. It is not certain what date John left Bavaria and settled in England.

The first picture of importance painted by Sartorius was for a Thomas Panton, around 1722, and represented a celebrated mare, "Molly", which had never been beaten on the turf except in the race which cost her her life. Among his other horse-portraits were those of the famous racehorse "Looby" (1735) for the Duke of Bolton; of "Old Traveller" (1741) for a Mr. William Osbaldeston; and "Careless" (1758) for the Duke of Kingston.

He showed only one picture at the Society of Artists, but exhibited 62 works at the Free Society of Artists. In 1780 he exhibited a portrait of a horse at the Royal Academy; Sartorius lived in London at 108 Oxford Street.

His son, and pupil, Francis Sartorius (1734–1804) was also a notable horse painter.

References

Further reading
Gilbey, Sir Walter. Animal painters of England from the year 1650, volume 2 (London: Vinton & Co., 1900).

External links
John Sartorius on Artnet

Equine artists
18th-century German painters
18th-century German male artists
German male painters
18th-century English painters
English male painters
German emigrants to the Kingdom of Great Britain
1700 births
1780 deaths
18th-century English male artists